Rampage is a 1987 American crime drama film written, produced and directed by William Friedkin. The film stars Michael Biehn, Alex McArthur, and Nicholas Campbell.

Plot summary
Charles Reece is a serial killer who commits a number of brutal mutilation-slayings in order to drink blood as a result of paranoid delusions. Reece is soon captured. Most of the film revolves around the trial and the prosecutor's attempts to have Reece found sane and given the death penalty. Defense lawyers, meanwhile, argue that the defendant is not guilty by reason of insanity. The prosecutor, Anthony Fraser, was previously against capital punishment, but he seeks such a penalty in the face of Reece's brutal crimes after meeting one victim's grieving family.

In the end, Reece is found sane and given the death penalty, but Fraser's internal debate about capital punishment is rendered academic when Reece is found to be insane by a scanning of his brain for mental illness. In the ending of the original version of the film, Reece is found dead in his cell, having overdosed himself on antipsychotics he had been stockpiling.

Alternative ending
In the ending of the revised version, Reece is sent to a state mental hospital, and in a chilling coda, he sends a letter to a person whose wife and child he has killed, asking the man to come and visit him. A final title card reveals that Reece is scheduled for a parole hearing in six months.

Cast

Influences
Charles Reece is loosely based on serial killer Richard Chase. The crimes that Reece commits are slightly different from Chase's, however; Reece kills three women, a man and a young boy, whereas Chase killed two men, two women (one of whom was pregnant), a young boy and a 22-month-old baby. Additionally, Reece escapes at one point—which Chase did not do—murdering two guards and later a priest. However, Reece and Chase similarly had a history of mental illness and an obsession with drinking blood. Unlike Reece, Chase was sentenced to death, but he was found dead in his prison cell, an apparent suicide, before the sentence could be carried out.

Soundtrack
The film's score was composed, orchestrated, arranged and conducted by Ennio Morricone and was released on vinyl LP, cassette and compact disc by Virgin Records.

Release
Rampage was filmed in 1986 in Stockton, California. It played at the Boston Film Festival in September 1987, and ran theatrically in some European countries in the late 1980s. Plans for the film's theatrical release in America were shelved when production studio DEG, the distributor of Rampage, went bankrupt. The film was unreleased in North America for five years. During that time, director Friedkin reedited the film, and changed the ending (with Reece no longer committing suicide in jail) before its US release in October 1992. The European video versions usually feature the film's original ending.

In retrospect, William Friedkin said: "At the time we made Rampage, [producer] Dino De Laurentiis was running out of money. He finally went bankrupt, after a long career as a producer. He was doing just scores of films and was unable to give any of them his real support and effort. And so literally by the time it came to release Rampage, he didn’t have the money to do it. And he was not only the financier, but the distributor. His company went bankrupt, and the film went to black for about five years. Eventually, the Weinsteins’ company Miramax took it out of bankruptcy and rereleased it. But this was among the lowest points in my career."

Reception
In his review, film critic Roger Ebert gave Rampage three stars out of four saying, "This is not a movie about murder so much as a movie about insanity—as it applies to murder in modern American criminal courts...Friedkin['s] message is clear: Those who commit heinous crimes should pay for them, sane or insane. You kill somebody, you fry—unless the verdict is murky or there were extenuating circumstances."

In retrospect William Friedkin said: "There are a lot of people who love Rampage, but I don’t think I hit my own mark with that".

Home media
As of 2010, the film has been released on DVD only in Poland, by SPI International.
The American edit of the film was released on LaserDisc in 1994 by Paramount Home Video.
Friedkin's original cut featuring the alternate ending and some additional footage was released on LaserDisc in Japan only by Shochiku Home Video in 1990.

References

 Friedkin, William, The Friedkin Connection, Harper Collins, 2013

External links
 
 
 

1987 crime drama films
1980s crime thriller films
1987 films
American crime drama films
American crime thriller films
American films based on plays
American independent films
Films about cannibalism
De Laurentiis Entertainment Group films
1980s English-language films
Films based on American novels
Films directed by William Friedkin
Films scored by Ennio Morricone
Films shot in California
Films about mental health
American serial killer films
1987 independent films
1980s American films